Ludwig Simon was born in 1819.  He became a lawyer in the town of Trier in the Rhineland of Germany.  Known for his democratic beliefs, Simon was elected to the Frankfurt National Assembly in 1848 and 1849.  In that assembly, he joined the "left wing" of the democratic group, which included Lorenzo Brentano and Arnold Ruge.   Following the dissolution of the Frankfurt Assembly, Simon emigrated to Switzerland.  Simon died in 1872.

References

1819 births
1872 deaths
19th-century German lawyers
People from Trier
Members of the Frankfurt Parliament
People from the Rhine Province